Clarke is a given name. Notable people with the name include:

 Clarke Abel (c. 1789 – 1826), British surgeon and naturalist
 Clarke W. Brown (died 1956), American politician
 Clarke Carlisle (born 1979), English footballer
 Clarke Dermody (born 1980), New Zealand rugby union footballer
 Clarke Fraser (1920–2014), Canadian medical geneticist
 Clarke Hinkle (1909–1988), American National Football League player
 Clarke Hogan (born 1969), American politician
 Clarke Howard Johnson (1851–1930), justice of the Rhode Island Supreme Court
 Clarke Lewis (1840–1896), United States Representative from Mississippi
 Clarke MacArthur (born 1985), Canadian National Hockey League player
 Clarke Peters (born 1952), American actor, singer, writer and director
 Clarke Reed (born 1928), American politician
 Clarke Rosenberg (born 1993), American-Israeli basketball player
 Clarke Scholes (1930–2010), American swimmer and Olympic gold medalist
 Clarke Wilm (born 1976), Canadian hockey player

See also
 Clarke, a surname